GRI or Gri may refer to:

Companies and organizations
 Gas Research Institute
 Geoscience Research Institute, of the Seventh-day Adventist Church
 Getty Research Institute, in Los Angeles, California
 Glasgow Royal Infirmary, a Scottish teaching hospital
 Global Reporting Initiative, an international standards organization
 Global Risk Institute in Financial Services, a Canadian think tank
 Grainger plc, a British residential property firm
 GrassRoots Interactive, an American lobbying firm
 Gypsum Recycling International, a Danish recycling firm

Transportation
 Central Nebraska Regional Airport
 Grand Island Army Air Field, operating 1942 to 1946
 Green River (Amtrak station), in Utah

Other
 General Rules for the Interpretation of the Harmonized System, rules about the classification of goods
 Global Retirement Index, an attempt to examine the factors that drive retirement security
 Ghari language, spoken on Guadalcanal in the Solomon Islands
 GABA reuptake inhibitor, a drug
 Glycine reuptake inhibitor, a type of drug which inhibits the reuptake of the neurotransmitter glycine
 Gri graphical language, a programming language

See also
 Georgius Rex Imperator (disambiguation)